David Vieira (born February 28, 1982) is a 4th Degree Black Belt in Brazilian Jiu-Jitsu (BJJ), a BJJ competitor, instructor, a professional mixed martial artist (MMA) fighter and the current 2022 World Master IBJJF Champion ( IBJJF).

Background

Vieira was born and raised in Rio de Janeiro, Brazil, and was seventeen when he started practicing Jiu-Jitsu. His first instructors were Alexandre de Lima and Rogerio Poggio at Infight Jiu-Jitsu Academy in Rio de Janeiro.

After winning Gold in the -77 kg and Absolute divisions of the World Jiu-Jitsu Championship in 2002, Vieira went to São Paulo to train with the founder of Infight Academy, 6th Degree BJJ Black Belt Totila ‘Pitoco’ Jordan Neto.

In 2004, Vieira came to the United States to compete at the Pan American Championship and that is when he was introduced to Gracie Barra by Eduardo de Lima. When Vieira went back to Brazil, he decided to join Gracie Barra Academy where in 2005 he was awarded his black belt.

Today Vieira is a Brazilian Jiu-Jitsu 3x World Champion, 5x National Champion (GI/No GI), 10x State Champion (GI/No GI), 2x Pan American Champion, 15x International Open Champion (GI/No GI), etc. Vieira is not only a very well accomplished BJJ competitor and MMA athlete but as an instructor he has also led his students to many victories at BJJ, MMA and Grappling Tournaments.

Vieira is the founder and head instructor at the DVBJJ Academy located in Rio de Janeiro, Brazil, with affiliated schools in France, Morocco, Belgium, United States and Australia.

In early 2022 Vieira has moved to the United States and has teamed up with Ross Kellin founder of Champions MMA.

BJJ Black Belts

Vieira has awarded Black Belts to:
 2008: Ciro Moura (Brazil) and Chad Robichaux (USA)
 2010: Hammoud Soufiane (France) and Antoine Bachelin (France)
 2012: Hicham Hakam ( First BJJ Black Belt in Morocco) and Diego Lander (Brazil)
 2013: Abderrahim Bounouch (Belgium), Rodrigo Calazans (Brazil), Rafael Garritano (Brazil), Joao M. Madureira (Brazil), Rafael Lopes (Brazil), Marcelo Carvalho (Brazil), Nick Antunes (Brazil) and Marcio Moreira (Brazil).
2017: Ricardo Rodrigues (Brazil), Renzzo Caenazzo (Brazil), Henrique Oliveira (Brazil), Daniel Albuquerque (Brazil), Eduardo Liberman (Brazil) and Wilhiam Almeida (Australia).

BJJ Highlights
David's notable wins via submission:
 Thales Leites from Nova Uniao via Choke
 Sergio Moraes from Alliance Jiu Jitsu via Triangle Choke
 Tarsis Humphreys from Alliance Jiu Jitsu via Choke
 Delson Heleno form Gordo Jiu-Jitsu via Choke
 Vagner Rocha from Team Popovitch 2x via Triangle Choke and Armlock
 Vinicius Marinho from GFTeam via Choke
 Mario "Big Hurt" Rinaldi from ATT via Rear Naked Choke
 Moacir "Boca" Oliveira from Team De La Riva via Armlock

Mixed Martial Arts Career

Early career
Vieira became a professional MMA fighter in 2007, and that same year he was featured in the MMA Authority Magazine as the new up and coming fighter, and was described by the magazine as the "Brazilian Prodigy." After 4 successful MMA fights in the United States David went back to Brazil to improve his MMA game and become a more complete fighter. Even though Vieira continued his MMA training, he decided to take some time off from professional MMA fighting to focus on running his jiu-jitsu school in Brazil.

The Ultimate Fighter: Brazil

David was chosen from an initial list of over 300 applicants at the TUF™ tryouts in Rio de Janeiro. Ranging from 18 to 35 years of age, these fighters came from all corners of Brazil, as well as countries such as Argentina and the United States. The fighters underwent interviews, medical exams and were tested on their striking and grappling skills until the final 28 emerged.

The group of 28 welterweights battled it out in elimination scraps in episodes one and two until only half of them remained. The 14 winners became the official cast members of The Ultimate Fighter house, where they were divided into two opposing teams.

Episode One: In March 2013, it was revealed that Vieira was a cast member of The Ultimate Fighter: Brazil 2.

Episode Two: Vieira won his elimination fight to get into the TUF house, defeating Leandro Silva (11-0) by unanimous decision and he was chosen to be a member of Team Nogueira.

Episode Three: In his second fight Vieira clashed with another undefeated fighter Yan Cabral (10-0) and lost by submission in the second round.

Episode Nine: Luis Dutra had to withdrawal due to injury, and Vieira was chosen to replace his teammate. It was announced that he would face the experienced Viscardi Andrade in the quarterfinals.

Episode Ten: Vieira lost his quarterfinals match by unanimous decision to Andrade, ending his run at becoming the next Ultimate Fighter.

Mixed Martial Arts Record

|-
|Win
|align=center|5–0
| Andre Chatuba
|Submission (rear naked choke)
|Fight for Life 3
|
|align=center|1
|align=center|1:38
|Rio de Janeiro, BRAZIL
|Fought at 185
|-
|Win
|align=center|4–0
| Efrain Ruiz
|Submission (rear naked choke)
|WFC VI
|
|align=center|1
|align=center|3:26
|Florida, USA
|Fought at 170
|-
|Win
|align=center|3–0
| Zack Barrios
|Submission (rear naked choke)
|RFC XI
|
|align=center|1
|align=center|1:22
|Florida, USA
|Fought at 170
|-
|Win
|align=center|2–0
| Benjamin Jordan
|Submission (triangle choke)
|WFC IV
|
|align=center|1
|align=center|2:42
|Florida, USA
|Fought at 170
|-
|Win
|align=center|1–0
| Fred Salsaverda
|Submission (triangle choke)
|WFC III
|
|align=center|1
|align=center|1:28
|Florida, USA
|Fought at 170

Mixed Martial Arts Exhibition Record

|-
|Loss
|align=center|1–2
| Viscardi Andrade
|Decision
|The Ultimate Fighter: Brazil 2
|N/A
|align=center| 2
|align=center| 5:00
|São Paulo, Brazil
|Fought at 170
|-
|Loss
|align=center|1–1
| Yan Cabral
|Submission (rear-naked choke)
|The Ultimate Fighter: Brazil 2
|N/A
|align=center| 2
|align=center| 2:59
|São Paulo, Brazil
|Fought at 170
|-
|Win
|align=center|1–0
| Leandro Silva
|Decision
|The Ultimate Fighter: Brazil 2
|N/A
|align=center| 2
|align=center| 5:00
|São Paulo, Brazil
|Fought at 170
|-

Reality TV Show

At the end of 2010 David was invited to be in a reality show in Brazil that aired nationwide at the Multishow channel in May 2011. The show is called Minha Praia (Portuguese for My Beach) and it's an original reality television adventure/reward game show in which teams of two people, man and women, compete with other teams. Contestants are isolated in a secluded beach in Brazil to compete for prizes. The show uses a system of progressive elimination, allowing the contestants to vote off other rival team members. At the end of the show David and his teammate Mirella Vieira finished as runner up, after they lost in the final round of elimination in a kayak competition.

See also
List of Brazilian Jiu-Jitsu practitioners

References

External links
 TUF Brazil 2
 GRACIE MAGAZINE
 David Vieira Brazilian Jiu-Jitsu
 UG MMA Record
 SHERDOG MMA Record
 IBJJF BLACK BELT RANKING

1982 births
Brazilian expatriate sportspeople in the United States
Brazilian male mixed martial artists
Brazilian practitioners of Brazilian jiu-jitsu
People awarded a black belt in Brazilian jiu-jitsu
Living people
Sportspeople from Rio de Janeiro (city)
Welterweight mixed martial artists
Mixed martial artists utilizing Brazilian jiu-jitsu